Kuantan Port (Latitude 3°58'N, Longitude 103° 26'E) is a multipurpose port in the East Coast Region of Peninsular Malaysia, situated about 25 km to the north of Kuantan city and facing South China Sea.

Previously run by Kuantan Port Authority, it has been privatised since 1998 and is currently operated by Kuantan Port Consortium Sdn Bhd. The port is part of the 21st Century Maritime Silk Road.

History

 1974  Kuantan Port Authority established
 1976  Construction of Kuantan Port started
 1979  Construction completed
 1980  Partial operation
 1984  Full operation
 1998  Privatised and managed by Kuantan Port Consortium Sdn Bhd since
 2001  Phase II Expansion (Inner Basin Project) completed
 2003  Dedicated Container Berth operational

Berth Facilities

Containerised Cargo Handling

Kuantan Port has containers handling equipment and machineries such as container gantry cranes, rubber tyred gantry cranes, reach stackers, container trailers and forklifts. It provides a container freight station of 9,600 square metres for the stuffing and unstuffing of containers and a container yard with 1,500 ground slots and 168 reefer points. Kuantan Port container yard offers one of the longest free storage period in Malaysia.

Kuantan - Kerteh Railway System (KKRS), a 75 km railway line, provides daily service between Kuantan Port and Kerteh's Petrochemical Complex.

Gallery

References

External links

 Location of Kuantan Port (zoom-in view)
 Satellite Image of Kuantan Port
 Kuantan Port Consortium
 Kuantan Port Authority

Kuantan
Ports and harbours of Malaysia
Transport in Pahang